Rota is a surname. Notable people with the surname include:

 Alfredo Rota
 Anthony Rota (born 1961), Canadian Member of Parliament
 Carlo Rota (born 1961), Canadian chef and actor
 Cristina Rota
 Darcy Rota
 Gian-Carlo Rota (1932–1999), Italian-born American mathematician and philosopher
 Jerome Rota
 Marco Rota (born 1942), Italian Disney comic artist
 Martino Rota (c. 1520–1583), artist
 Nino Rota (1911–1979), Italian composer
 Randy Rota
 Sal Rota
 Simone Rota

See also
 Juan Diego Botto-Rota

Italian-language surnames